This is the list of cathedrals in Colombia sorted by denomination.

Roman Catholic 
Cathedrals of the Roman Catholic Church in Colombia:
 Cathedral of Our Lady of Carmel in Apartadó
 Cathedral of St. Barbara in Arauca
 Cathedral of the Immaculate Conception in Armenia
 Cathedral of the Sacred Heart in Barrancabermeja
 Metropolitan Cathedral of Queen Mary in Barranquilla
 Primatial Cathedral Basilica of the Immaculate Conception in Bogotá
 Cathedral of the Holy Family in Bucaramanga
 Cathedral of St. Bonaventure in Buenaventura
 Cathedral of St. Peter the Apostle in Buga
 Cathedral of Our Lady of Mercies in Caldas
 Cathedral of St. Peter the Apostle in Santiago de Cali
 Metropolitan Cathedral Basilica of Saint Catherine of Alexandria in Cartagena de Indias
 Catedral Nuestra Señora del Carmen in Cartago
 Cathedral of the Sacred Heart of Jesus in Chiquinquirá
 Cathedral of St. Joseph in Cúcuta
 Cathedral of St. Lawrence in Duitama
 Co-Cathedral of St. Martin in Sogamoso
 Catedral Nuestra Señora de La Candelaria in El Banco
 Cathedral of St. John the Baptist in Engativá
 Cathedral of Our Lady of Rosary in Espinal
 Cathedral of Our Lady of the Rosary in Facatativá
 Cathedral of Our Lady of Lourdes in Florencia
 Cathedral of St. James the Apostle in Fontibón
 Cathedral of Our Lady of the Rosary in Garagoa
 Cathedral of St. Michael the Archangel in Garzón
 Cathedral of the Immaculate Heart of Mary in Girardot
 Cathedral of Our Lady of the Rosary in Girardota
 Cathedral of Our Lady of Mount Carmel in Granada
 Cathedral of the Immaculate Conception in Guapi
 Cathedral of the Immaculate Conception in Ibagué
 Cathedral of Our Lady of Carmel in Inírida
 Cathedral of St. Peter Martyr in Ipiales
 Cathedral of St. Paul the Apostle in Istmina
 Co-Cathedral of St. Joseph in Tadó
 Cathedral of Our Lady of Mercy in Jericó
 Cathedral of Our Lady of Carmel in La Dorada
 Co-Cathedral of St. Michael the Archangel in Guaduas
 Cathedral of Our Lady of Peace in Leticia
 Cathedral of Our Lady of Carmel in Líbano
 Cathedral of Our Lady of Candelaria in Magangue
 Cathedral of the Immaculate Conception in Málaga
 Co-Cathedral of the Immaculate Conception in Soatá
 Cathedral Basilica of Our Lady of Rosary in Manizales
 Metropolitan Cathedral Basilica of the Immaculate Conception of Mary in Medellín
 Cathedral of St. Alphonsus de Ligouri in Sibundoy
 Co-Cathedral of St. Michael in Mocoa
 Cathedral of the Holy Cross in Montelíbano
 Cathedral of St. Jerome in Montería
 Cathedral of the Immaculate Conception in Neiva
 Cathedral of St. Clare in Pamplona
 Military Cathedral of Jesus Christ Redeemer in Bogotá
 Cathedral of St. Ann in Ocaña
 Catedral de Nuestra Señora del Rosario del Palmar in Palmira
 Catedral de San Ezequiel Moreno Díaz in San Juan de Pasto
 Catedral de Nuestra Señora de la Pobreza in Pereira
 Catedral Basílica de Nuestra Señora de la Asunción in Popayán
 Cathedral of Our Lady of Carmel in Puerto Carreño
 Cathedral of Mary Mother of the Church in Puerto Gaitan
 Cathedral of St. Francis of Assisi in Quibdó
 Catedral Nuestra Señora de los Remedios in Riohacha
 Cathedral of the Holy Family in San Andrés
 Cathedral of St. Joseph in San José del Guaviare
 Catedral Basílica Metropolitana in Santa Fe de Antioquia
 Cathedral-Basilica of St. Martha in Santa Marta
 Cathedral of Our Lady of the Rosary in Santa Rosa de Osos
 Cathedral of St. Francis of Assisi in Sincelejo
 Catedral de Jesucristo Nuestra Paz in Soacha
 Cathedral of Our Lady of Help in Socorro
 Co-Cathedral of the Holy Cross in San Gil
 Cathedral of Our Lady of Chiquinquirá in Sonsón
 Co-Cathedral of St. Nicholas in Rionegro
 Cathedral of St. Louis Betran in Tibú
 Cathedral of the Immaculate Conception in Trinidad
 Cathedral of St. Andrew in Tumaco
 Cathedral Basilica of St. James the Apostle in Tunja
 Cathedral of Our Lady of the Rosary in Valledupar
 Cathedral of Our Lady of the Snows in Vélez
 Cathedral of Our Lady of Mount Carmel in Villavicencio
 Cathedral of St. Joseph in Yopal
 Cathedral of the Most Holy Trinity in Zipaquirá

Anglican
Cathedrals of the Province 9 of the Episcopal Church in the United States of America:
 San Pablo Cathedral in Bogotá

See also
List of cathedrals
Christianity in Colombia

References

Cathedrals in Colombia
Colombia
Cathedrals
Cathedrals